A radio operator (also, formerly, wireless operator in British and Commonwealth English) is a person who is responsible for the operations of a radio system.  The profession of radio operator has become largely obsolete with the automation of radio-based tasks in recent decades.  Nevertheless, radio operators are still employed in maritime and aviation fields.  In most cases radio transmission is now only one of several tasks of a radio operator.  In the United States, the title of Certified Radio Operator is granted to those who pass a test issued by the Society of Broadcast Engineers.

The role of 'Wireless Operator' aboard aircraft during WWII was often abbreviated  to 'WOp' or 'WOP' in official documents or obituaries.

See also  
 Wireless telegraphy
 Wireless (disambiguation)

References 

Professional titles and certifications
Radio